The  is Japan's first golf course, built on Mount Rokko in 1903 by English expatriate Arthur Hasketh Groom. The club began as a nine-hole course on May 24, 1903, but quickly expanded to eighteen the following year. 

Strict rules are enforced to maintain the course's pristine condition such as a prohibition of golf carts and a limit of eight clubs per player.  As the course was literally carved out of a mountain, it can be quite demanding and clubs are carried in canvas bags to reduce the strain on caddies.

Scorecard

Gallery

References

External links

  Official Site

Golf clubs and courses in Japan
Tourist attractions in Kobe
Sports venues in Hyōgo Prefecture
Merrell Hitotsuyanagi buildings